The Young Elizabethan was a British children's literary magazine of the 20th century.

History and profile
The magazine was founded in 1948 as Collins Magazine for Boys & Girls. It was first published in Canada due to limitations of paper use in the United Kingdom. Production in Britain became possible in 1950. In 1953, two weeks before the coronation of Elizabeth II, the magazine changed its name to The Young Elizabethan to honour the new queen. In 1958 it changed again to The Elizabethan.

The Young Elizabethan generally serialised novels and also contained short stories, book reviews, poems, puzzles, and drawings. It was targeted at grammar school students. It ceased publication in 1973.

One of the magazine's editors was Kaye Webb, from January 1955 to January 1958.

References

Humphrey Carpenter and Mari Prichard (1984). The Oxford Companion to Children's Literature (Oxford: Oxford University Press) s.v. "Young Elizabethan".

1948 establishments in the United Kingdom
1973 disestablishments in the United Kingdom
Children's magazines published in the United Kingdom
Defunct literary magazines published in the United Kingdom
Magazines established in 1948
Magazines disestablished in 1973
Education magazines